The Pan-American Life Building, located at 601 Poydras Street in the Central Business District of New Orleans, Louisiana, is a 28-story, -tall high-rise building. Designed by Skidmore, Owings & Merrill, it was built in 1980 as the headquarters for the Pan-American Life Insurance Co.

In December 2006, Pan-American sold the building to Equastone, a California real estate company. The Hotel Intercontinental, which adjoins the Pan-American Life Center and is owned by the insurance company, was not included in the sale to Equastone.

In December 2010, Stirling 601 Poydras, LLC, an entity composed of local investors led by Stirling Properties, acquired the Pan-American Life Center in New Orleans, Louisiana from Equastone Real Estate Investment Advisors, a private real estate investment firm in San Diego, California.

Location

Pan-American Life Building is bounded by the following streets:
 Poydras Street (north)
 Gravier Street (south)
 St. Charles Avenue (east)
 Camp Street (west)

See also
 List of tallest buildings in New Orleans

Footnotes

External links
 Official website
 Pan American Life Building on Emporis.com
 

Skyscraper office buildings in New Orleans
Office buildings completed in 1980
Skidmore, Owings & Merrill buildings